Consumed is the first novel by the Canadian filmmaker, screenwriter and actor David Cronenberg. The novel is driven by a globe-trotting, photojournalist couple, that pursue stories featuring rather unusual people.

Reviews 
Cronenberg's novel has been compared to Burroughs, Ballard and DeLillo. The book was reviewed in The New York Times, The Guardian and The Independent.

According to WorldCat, the book is held in 622 libraries.

References

2014 Canadian novels
Novels about geopolitics
Books with cover art by Chip Kidd
2014 debut novels
Charles Scribner's Sons books